Bayes Business School, formerly known as Cass Business School, is the business school of City, University of London, located in St Luke's, just to the north of the City of London. It was established in 1966, and it is consistently ranked as one of the leading business schools in the United Kingdom.

Bayes Business School is divided into the three faculties of actuarial science and insurance, finance, and management. It awards BSc (Hons), MSc, MBA and PhD degrees and is one of around 100 schools globally to be triple accredited by the AMBA in the United Kingdom, EQUIS in Europe, and the AACSB in the United States.

History
The City University Business School was founded in 1966 as part of City University, London. Its MSc in Administrative Sciences began in 1967 and became the MBA in 1979.

In 2002, following a donation from the Sir John Cass Foundation, the school moved to new premises in the London Borough of Islington, and changed its name to Cass Business School.

This was part of a strategy formed by Lord Currie of Marylebone, who had become Dean the year before, to compete as an international business school in a market dominated by US universities.

The school had previously been spread out across the City of London's mainly residential Barbican Centre development. Half of the £40 million funding for the new building came from the reserves of City University.

Due to John Cass's links to slavery, the school was renamed to Bayes Business School on 6 September 2021, after Thomas Bayes, a nonconformist theologian and mathematician best known for his foundational work on conditional probability.

Masters courses 
The school teaches programmes including insurance and risk management, investment management, corporate finance, banking and International finance, quantitative finance, shipping, marketing, supply chain, energy, trade and finance, property valuation, mathematical trading, real estate, construction management, international accounting and finance, finance and investment, real estate investment, and business analytics

The school's MBA is offered full-time through a one-year course, or through two years part-time Executive MBA, or two years through the modular Executive MBA.

In September 2007 the business school started EMBA in collaboration with DIFC (Dubai International Financial Centre).

School rankings 
The school was in the top 10 in the UK under both "Accounting and Finance" and "Business and Management" in the 2017 QS World University Rankings by subjects. In the 2017 Eduniversal BestMaster:
 MSc International Accounting & Finance ranked 5th in the UK under Accounting & Audit.
 MSc Insurance & Risk Management ranked 12th in the world and 1st in the UK under Insurance category.
In 2017 the Times Higher Education world university rankings listed the school 8th in the UK under "Business and Economics".

Notable alumni
The school's Alumni Association has more than 38,000 members in 160 countries.

 William Castell – Chairman of the Wellcome Trust; a Director of General Electric and BP; former CEO of Amersham plc
 Peter Cullum – British entrepreneur
 Tobias Ellwood – Conservative Member of Parliament and Chair of the Defence Select Committee
 Stelios Haji-Ioannou – founder of easyGroup
 Tom Ilube philanthropist; physicist; tech guru and Chair of the RFU
 Bob Kelly – former CEO of Bank of New York Mellon, Mellon Financial Corporation and Wachovia Corporation
 Muhtar Kent – CEO of The Coca-Cola Company; former president and COO of Coca-Cola International and Executive Vice President of The Coca-Cola Company
Jonathan Kestenbaum, Baron Kestenbaum (born 1959) - chief operating officer of investment trust RIT Capital Partners, and a Labour member of the House of Lords
 Liu Mingkang – former Chairman of the China Banking Regulatory Commission
 Barrie Pettman, Baron of Bombie, co-founder and Chairman Emeritus of the Emerald Group Publishing; President Emeritus of Burke's Peerage
 Syed Ali Raza – President and Chairman of the National Bank of Pakistan
 Set Aung – politician, economist and management consultant, incumbent Deputy Planning and Finance Minister of Myanmar 
 Martin Wheatley – former Chief Executive of the UK Financial Conduct Authority
 Jeff Wooller – British accountant
 Ruth Yeoh – Malaysian environmentalist and businesswoman
Jay Shetty – Internet Personality and Motivational Speaker
 Evan Edinger – American-born YouTuber based in London, England
 Jihan Abass – Kenyan entrepreneur, business woman, CEO and founder of Lami Insurance Technology and Griffin Insurance

References

External links 
 Official website

City, University of London
Business schools in England
Professional education in London
1966 establishments in England
Educational institutions established in 1966